The Forest Hills School in Franklin, Tennessee was built in 1907.  Along with Liberty School and Liberty Hill School, it is one of the three best surviving examples in Williamson County of one room schoolhouses built during 1900–1920.  While most of these schools have been lost, they once provided the majority of public education in the county.

It was listed on the National Register of Historic Places in 1988.

The property is denoted WM-670 among Williamson County's historic resources.

References

External links
Forest Hills School class picture, c.1922, courtesy Algood Historical Society

School buildings on the National Register of Historic Places in Tennessee
Buildings and structures in Franklin, Tennessee
One-room schoolhouses in Tennessee
School buildings completed in 1907
National Register of Historic Places in Williamson County, Tennessee
1907 establishments in Tennessee